Corley services is a motorway service station between junctions 3 and 3A of the M6 motorway in the county of Warwickshire, England. It is close to the village of Corley, with the nearest city being Coventry several miles to the south, with Birmingham being situated slightly further to the west. A footbridge, made of concrete but now clad in green fibreglass panelling, spans the motorway to link services on both sides.

Corley was opened in 1972 (a year after the section of motorway it serves) and was originally operated by Forte. It is currently operated by Welcome Break and receives approximately 2 million visitors per year.

In December 2003, Corley became the first motorway service station to have a permanent Police Community Support Officer, jointly funded by Welcome Break and Warwickshire Police.

References

External links 
Welcome Break Motorway Services - Corley - M6 Motorway
Motorway Services Online - Corley
Motorway Services Trivia Site - Corley

M6 motorway service stations
Welcome Break motorway service stations